Ride Around Mount Rainier in One Day (RAMROD) is a 154-mile (248 km) cycling event through the scenery of Mount Rainier National Park, Washington, featuring approximately  of elevation gain over two mountain passes.  The Redmond Cycling Club has been sponsoring the annual event since 1984.  The ride is held on the last Thursday of July.

In 2007 the event was held with a modified route that did not circumnavigate Mount Rainier. The modified route was necessary due to the closure and severe damage to many roads in and near the park from the heavy rains during the Fall of 2006. In 2008 the Redmond Cycling Club moved back to the traditional route for the 25th anniversary of the event. The 2009 edition also featured a modified course due to a washout on Stevens Canyon Road.

Registration for the event is through a lottery system. The National Park Service has asked that the club limit the number of riders to 800. Volunteering for the event is one way to secure a place in the subsequent year's RAMROD.

This event has become so popular and difficult to obtain a tickets for that many of the local charity organizations auction off tickets for several times face value.

The event route starts and ends in Enumclaw, WA, usually at Thunder Mountain Middle School (July 2015 and prior year rides usually started and ended at Enumclaw High School).

References

External links
 http://www.redmondcyclingclub.org/RAMROD/RAMROD.html
 http://www.mikeutley.org/bicyclepaper04.html
 http://seattletimes.nwsource.com/html/sports/2001992762_zylstra30.html

Cycling events in the United States
Bicycle tours
Cycling in Washington (state)
Mount Rainier